Theresa M. Glomb is an American academic. She is the Toro Company-David M. Lilly Chair in Human Resources Department of Work and Organizations at the University of Minnesota's Carlson School of Management.

Career
Glomb earned her Bachelor of Arts degree in psychology from DePaul University before enrolling at the University of Illinois at Urbana–Champaign  for her Master's degree and PhD.

In 2015, Glomb was appointed the inaugural Toro Company-David M. Lilly Chair in Human Resources Department of Work and Organizations.

References

External links

Living people
DePaul University alumni
University of Illinois Urbana-Champaign alumni
Carlson School of Management faculty
American women academics
Year of birth missing (living people)
21st-century American women